Johannes Hübner (born 7 October 1956 in Vienna) was an Austrian politician and Member of the National Council (Parliament) for Vienna South-West for the Freedom Party of Austria (FPÖ) 2008- Oct 2017. He previously sat in parliament for Vienna District 4 (1986-1997). He was until October 2017 the party's spokesman on Foreign Affairs.

He graduated from Vienna University with a Doctorate in Law in 1979 and took articles 1980–86, when he commenced working as a lawyer. He is today the legal advisor to the FPO, which is the co-partner in the coalition government of Austria.

On 3rd February 2023, leaked emails revealed that a Kremlin-linked lobbying group offered payments to several European politicians to promote pro-Russia policies. According to these emails, Johannes Hübner was in this group of these politicians, and he gets €20,000 for holding a speech in the Austrian parliament against sanctions on Russia. He would have received an extra €15,000 if the vote had been successful.

A Motion for a resolution was registered on the official parliament website on June 7, 2016, to cancel sanctions imposed on Russia due to "considerable "harm to the Austrian economy" (the same thesis as in leaked emails).

References

 Parliamentary biography: https://www.parlament.gv.at/WWER/PAD_51561/

1956 births
Living people
Members of the National Council (Austria)
Freedom Party of Austria politicians